Parapoynx longialata is a moth in the family Crambidae. It was described by Yoshiyasu in 1983. It is found in Thailand.

References

Acentropinae
Moths described in 1983